Plaridel can refer to:
the penname of Marcelo H. del Pilar 
Arellano University – Plaridel Campus
J. Plaridel Silvestre, Scouting notable, awardee of the Bronze Wolf in 1977
 The name of three places in the Philippines: 
Plaridel, Bulacan
Plaridel, Misamis Occidental
Plaridel, Quezon
Plaridel Airport
Port of Plaridel